Astropectinides is a genus of echinoderms belonging to the family Astropectinidae.

?The species of this genus are found in Pacific Ocean.

Species:

Astropectinides callistus 
Astropectinides ctenophora 
Astropectinides mesactus

References

Astropectinidae
Asteroidea genera